Ancient is an album by Japanese new age artist, Kitarō, which was released in 2001.

The album was nominated for 44th Grammy Awards New Age Best Album in 2002.

Track listing

Charts and awards

Personnel
Kitaro - Keyboards
Gary Barlough - Engineer
Barry Goldberg - Mix
Doug Sax - Mastering

Additional Personnel
Eiichi Naito - Management
Dino Malito - Management
Kazu Kuni - Art Direction & Design

References

External links
Kitaro Official site (English)
Kitaro Official site (Japanese)
Kitaro TV - Kitaro's official YouTube page
Kitaro Facebook

Kitarō albums
2001 albums